Alastair Sooke (born 1981) is an English art critic, journalist and broadcaster, most notable for reporting and commenting on art for the British media and writing and presenting documentaries on art and art history for BBC television and radio. His BBC documentaries include Modern Masters for BBC One and three three-part series, Treasures of Ancient Rome, Treasures of Ancient Egypt, and Treasures of Ancient Greece, for BBC Four.

Sooke is chief art critic at The Daily Telegraph, writing on art and art history, including on the Turner Prize and contemporary art. He is also a regular presenter on The Culture Show.

Biography
Sooke was born in west London in October 1981 and educated at Westminster School, an independent boarding school in Central London, where he was a Queen's Scholar,. At the age of fourteen Sooke starred as Kay Harker in a BBC Radio 4 adaptation of John Masefield's children's fantasy novel, The Box of Delights. Sooke won a Westminster Scholarship to Christ Church, Oxford, where he read English language and literature and won the university's Charles Oldham Shakespeare Prize. After graduating with a First, he studied for an M.A. at the Courtauld Institute of Art in London.

Sooke lives in London with his wife and three children.

Sooke is known as a writer and presenter of documentaries on art and art history for BBC television and radio.  His BBC documentaries include Modern Masters (for BBC One), exploring four artists who shaped modern art; the tripartite series Treasures of Ancient Rome in 2012, Treasures of Ancient Egypt in 2014, and Treasures of Ancient Greece in 2015, all for BBC Four, and How the Devil Got His Horns, a history of depictions of the Devil in Western art (also for BBC Four).

Sooke also serves as an art critic, and writes periodical-length pieces on art theory, history and criticism, as well as penning investigative pieces that have appeared in journals, and newspapers. These include The Telegraph, where he is a deputy art critic after joining the paper as a trainee journalist in 2003. He appears regularly on BBC2's The Culture Show. In addition, Sooke has written books on pop art, Henri Matisse and Roy Lichtenstein.

Filmography
Television
{| class="wikitable"
|-
! Year !! Work !! Channel
|-
| 2010 || Modern Masters|| BBC One
|-
| 2011 || Romancing the Stone: The Golden Ages of British Sculpture|| BBC Four
|-
| 2011 || The Perfect Suit || BBC Four
|-
| 2011 || The Summer Exhibition: BBC Arts at the Royal Academy || BBC Two
|-
| 2011 || The World's Most Expensive Paintings|| BBC One
|-
| 2012 || How the Devil Got His Horns: A Diabolical Tale || BBC Four
|-
| 2012 || Unfinished Masterpieces || BBC Two
|-
| 2012 || The Summer Exhibition: BBC Arts at the Royal Academy || BBC Two
|-
| 2012 || Treasures of Ancient Rome|| BBC Four
|-
| 2013 || Pride and Prejudice: Having a Ball || BBC Two
|-
| 2013 || The Summer Exhibition: BBC Arts at the Royal Academy || BBC Two
|-
| 2013 || Whaam! Roy Lichtenstein at Tate Modern || BBC Four
|-
| 2014 || Constable: A Country Rebel || BBC Four
|-
| 2014 || Pop Go the Women: The Other Story of Pop Art || BBC Two
|-
| 2014 || The Summer Exhibition: BBC Arts at the Royal Academy || BBC Two
|-
| 2014 || The World’s Most Expensive Stolen Paintings|| BBC Two
|-
| 2014 || Treasures of Ancient Egypt || BBC Four
|-
| 2015 || Soup Cans and Superstars: How Pop Art Changed the World || BBC Four
|-
| 2015 || Treasures of Ancient Greece|| BBC Four
|-
| 2016 || Lichtenstein: A Retrospective || BBC Two
|-
| 2016 || Robert  Rauschenberg: Pop Art Pioneer ||
|-
| 2017 || An Art Lovers' Guide || BBC Two
|-
| 2017 || Trump on Culture: Brave New World || BBC Two
|-
| 2018 || An Art Lover's Guide || BBC Two
|-
| 2020 || Museums In Quarantine: Warhol || BBC Four
|}

Bibliography
 Postcards from Vegas (2011) 
 Roy Lichtenstein: How Modern Art was Saved by Donald Duck (2013) 
 Henri Matisse: A Second Life (2014)  
 Pop Art: A Colourful History '' (2015)

References

1981 births
Living people
Alumni of Christ Church, Oxford
Alumni of the Courtauld Institute of Art
British television personalities
British writers
The Daily Telegraph people
English art critics
English male journalists
English television personalities
English writers
People educated at Westminster School, London